Chiripa may refer to:
 Chiripa culture, an archaeological culture of Bolivia
 , a Guaraní subgroup of Paraguay, Argentina and Brazil
 Chiripá language, their language

Language and nationality disambiguation pages